Santa Rita, officially the Municipality of Santa Rita, is a 3rd class municipality in the province of Samar, Philippines. According to the 2020 census, it has a population of 42,384 people.

Santa Rita is connected to Tacloban and Leyte Island by the San Juanico Bridge.

History
The town guarding the northern entrance of the beautiful strait in the Region, the San Juanico Strait, is the calm and serene town of Santa Rita, Samar. It is in this place where the longest single span bridge in Asia, the San Juanico Bridge also known as the “Bridge of Love” is located. The bridge traverses the picturesque water strip that connects the island of Samar and Leyte as vital link of the Pan-Philippine Highway.

Bounded by the Province of Eastern Samar in the east; Talalora in the west; Villareal and Pinabacdao in the north; and Municipality of Basey in the south. The town is located along the seacoast. Verdant hills and mountains surround the hinterland that is somewhat two triangular in shape with irregular borderlines that face the seaway. The climate is favorable to agriculture, which is typical in the region.

Local tradition dates the founding of this town in late 18th century. According to some aged inhabitants, the original settlers were the tribes of the Amistoso, Lacambra, and Agoy. Joaquin Amistoso rose to be their leader. The San Juanico Strait was supposed to have been named in his honor. These people made their living by fishing and small-scale farming.
Captain Bartolome Sanchez, the head of a Spanish expedition in 1800, was captivated by the friendliness and hospitality of the people in the island so he decided to stay and help them. He called the neighboring tribes to unite with them and appointed Joaquin Amistoso to be the Cabeza de Barangay. 
In years between 1810 and 1898, several attempts of fleet of Moro vintas or “pancos” who tried to rob the puro's golden bell, which was given by the Spaniards. Aged inhabitants believed that this bell had a melodious sound, which echoed up to Mindanao. This attracted the Moros who kept on attempting to raid the place. The tribes who guarded the bell to keep it safe in the “puro” fought against the moros. The ruins of the fortress locally known as “barawalte” still stands today and are mute evidence of Moro raids in the past. Today, the question of the whereabouts of the bell is still on the minds of the people because it is nowhere to be found.
The first site of the town was a small island between Samar and Leyte originally known as “Puro”. Later, it was called Tabucan because the natives from the mainland had to cross the strait before reaching the island community. Now, it is officially called Santa Rita.

Originally, the patron saint of the town was Saint Roch (San Roque). Later, it was changed to Santa Rita of Cascia. Some aged residents said that a fisherman while promenading along the shore saw a woman walking by the sea at a distance. When he came nearer where he saw the woman, he found out that it was just a log. This phenomenon occurred three times. The fisherman became curios, so he turned the log and saw the face of a nun. He brought this statue to the priest at “Puro”. The priest identified the statue as Saint Rita of Cascia. From then on, the people of the place changed their patron saint from Saint Roque to Saint Rita of Cascia. As the days went on, the residents renamed the place from “Puro” or Tabucan to Santa Rita. From that time on, it was said that the saint performed many miracles to protect the people in the island most especially against the moro raids. Years passed and Santa Rita was rapidly populated. The inhabitants transferred across the mainland of Samar to a place called Lalawiton, the present site of the municipality.

On January 2, 1864, the Spanish authorities officially recognized the municipality of Santa Rita. Before that time, Santa Rita belonged to the municipality of Basey. This is the statement of declaration of the Spaniards when they fully acknowledged the municipality, “La fundacion de este pueblo se debe á los RR. PP. agustinos, hallándose como vista del de Basey cuando recibimos de dichos RR. PP. su administracion el año de 1804.  Por decreto del Superior Gobierno de 2 de Enero de 1864 fué separado de Basey, formando parroquia con la vista de Catongaan”. Santa Rita was separated from Basey because Santa Rita has established its own parish.

Geography

Barangays
Santa Rita is politically subdivided into 38 barangays. In 1957, sitio Dampigan was converted into a barrio.

Climate

Demographics

Economy

Government

List of former chief executives
In 1908, the first local elections were held and Pedro Amistoso was elected municipal president. Succeeding him were:
 Mamerto Ilagan (1910)
 Alipio Regaret (1912)
 Inocencio Hilvano (1916)
 Florentino Nerviol (1928-1932), (1942-1946)
 Margarito Caberic (1932-1940), (1946-1947)
 Conrado Adolfo (1940-1941)
 Isidro Zeta (1947)
 Simplicio Lacaba (1947-1954)
 Gaudencio Espino Sr. (1960-1968)
 Pedro Hilvano (1954-1960), (1968-1982)
 Densaldo Alvarez (1982-1986)
 Silverio Macariola (1986-1998)
 Leticia Macariola (1998-2000)
 Beatriz Tiopes (2000-2007)
 Lisandro Kim Adolfo (2007-2013)
 Joven Tiu (2013–present)

References

External links
 Santa Rita Profile at PhilAtlas.com
 [ Philippine Standard Geographic Code]
 Philippine Census Information
 Local Governance Performance Management System

Municipalities of Samar (province)